These hits topped the Ultratop 50 in 2002.

See also
2002 in music

References

2002 in Belgium
2002 record charts
2002